The Association of Teachers and Lecturers (ATL) was a trade union, teachers' union and professional association, affiliated to the Trades Union Congress, in the United Kingdom representing educators from nursery and primary education to further education.  In March 2017, ATL members endorsed a proposed merger with the National Union of Teachers to form a new union known as the National Education Union, which came into existence on 1 September 2017.  At that time, approximately 120,000 individuals belonged to the union (apart from those professions included in the name, education support staff and teaching assistants were also members), making it the third largest teaching and education union in the UK. ATL had members throughout England, Scotland, Wales, Northern Ireland, the Channel Islands, the Isle of Man, and British Service schools overseas.

The ATL brand continues as a section or subsidiary of the National Education Union.

Governance and administration
ATL was led by its Executive Committee who were assisted by a General Secretary. All senior officers and officials were elected by an Association wide ballot and the overall direction was determined by the Annual Conference which had delegates from each branch.

The ATL President served a one-year term.
From September 2009, Lesley Ward.
From September 2010, Andy Brown.
From September 2011, Alice Robinson.
From September 2012, Hank Roberts.
From September 2013, Alison Sherratt.
From September 2014, Mark Baker.
From September 2015, Kim Knappett.
From September 2016, Shelagh Hirst.
From September 2017, Niamh Sweeney.
From September 2018, Kim Knappett who became Joint President of the National Education Union on 1 January 2019.
The final ATL General Secretary was Dr Mary Bousted.

History

The origins of ATL go back to 1884 when 180 women met to create the Association of Assistant Mistresses (AAM). These women worked in schools founded for higher education of girls. Their concern was primarily for the pupils.  However, in 1921, the AAM appointed representatives to the newly formed Burnham Committee on Salaries in Secondary Schools.

1891 saw the formation of the Association of Assistant Masters in Secondary Schools (AMA). Its purpose was to protect and improve the conditions of service of secondary teachers. Between 1899 and 1908 it played an influential part in obtaining security of tenure for assistant teachers through the Endowed Schools Act.

Then in 1978 AAM and AMA merged to form the Assistant Masters and Mistresses Association (AMMA) with a membership of approximately 75,000.  The name was changed in 1993 to the Association of Teachers and Lecturers (ATL).

ATL affiliated to the TUC in 1999.  It resigned from the Irish Congress of Trade Unions in 2015.

In January 2011, the Association for College Management merged into ATL.

Annual Conferences from 2009

 2009 Liverpool
 2010 Manchester
 2011 Liverpool
 2012 Manchester
 2013 Liverpool
 2014 Manchester
 2015 Liverpool
 2016 Liverpool

General Secretaries from 1978
 1978: Andrew Hutchings and Joyce Baird
 1979: Geoff Beynon and Joyce Baird
 1988: Peter Smith and Joyce Baird
 1990: Peter Smith
 2003: Mary Bousted

See also

 Education in the United Kingdom

References

External links
 
 Catalogue of the AMMA archives held at the Modern Records Centre, University of Warwick
 Catalogue of the Association of Assistant Mistresses archives, held at the Modern Records Centre, University of Warwick

Trade unions in the United Kingdom
Education trade unions
1978 establishments in the United Kingdom
Trade unions established in 1978
Teacher associations based in the United Kingdom
2017 disestablishments in the United Kingdom
Trade unions disestablished in 2017
Trade unions based in London